Libutti is a surname. Notable people with the surname include:

Frank Libutti (born 1945), retired United States Marine Corps Lieutenant General 
Lorenzo Libutti (born 1997), Italian footballer
Steven Libutti (born 1964), American surgeon and scientist